This is a list of schools in Borough of Warrington in the English county of Cheshire, England.

State-funded schools

Primary schools

Alderman Bolton Primary School, Latchford
Appleton Thorn Primary School, Appleton Thorn
Barrow Hall Community Primary School, Great Sankey
Beamont Primary School, Warrington
Bewsey Lodge Primary School, Bewsey
Birchwood CE Primary School, Birchwood
Bradshaw Community Primary School, Grappenhall
Brook Acre Community Primary School, Padgate
Broomfields Junior School, Appleton
Bruche Primary School Academy, Padgate
Burtonwood Community Primary School, Burtonwood
Callands Primary School, Warrington
Chapelford Village Primary School, Great Sankey
Cherry Tree Primary School, Lymm
Christ Church CE Primary School, Padgate
Cinnamon Brow CE Primary School, Fearnhead
The Cobbs Infant and Nursery School, Appleton
Croft Primary School, Croft
Culcheth Community Primary School, Culcheth
Dallam Community Primary School, Dallam
Evelyn Street Primary School, Warrington
Glazebury CE Primary School, Glazebury
Gorse Covert Primary School, Birchwood
Grappenhall Heys Community Primary School, Grappenhall
Grappenhall St Wilfrid's CE Primary School, Grappenhall
Great Sankey Primary School, Great Sankey
Latchford St James CE Primary School, Latchford
Locking Stumps Community Primary School, Birchwood
Meadowside Community Primary and Nursery School, Longford
Newchurch Community Primary School, Culcheth
Oakwood Avenue Community Primary School, Warrington
Oughtrington Primary School, Lymm
Our Lady's RC Primary School, Latchford
Park Road Community Primary School, Great Sankey
Penketh Community Primary School, Penketh
Penketh South Community Primary School, Penketh
Ravenbank Primary School, Lymm
Sacred Heart RC Primary School, Warrington
St Alban's RC Primary School, Warrington
St Andrew's CE Primary School, Orford
St Augustine's RC Primary School, Latchford
St Benedict's RC Primary School, Warrington
St Bridget's RC Primary School, Fearnhead
St Elphin's (Fairfield) CE Primary School, Warrington
St Helen's CE Primary School, Hollins Green
St Joseph's RC Primary School, Penketh
St Lewis' RC Primary School, Croft
St Margaret's CE Primary School, Orford
St Monica's RC Primary School, Appleton
St Oswald's RC Primary School, Padgate
St Paul of The Cross RC Primary School, Warrington
St Peter's RC Primary School, Woolston
St Philip (Westbrook) CE Primary School, Woolston
St Stephen's RC Primary School, Orford
St Thomas' CE Primary School, Stockton Heath
St Vincent's RC Primary School, Penketh
Sankey Valley St James CE Primary School, Great Sankey
Statham Primary School, Lymm
Stockton Heath Primary School, Stockton Heath
Stretton St Matthew's CE Primary School, Stretton
Thelwall Infant School, Thelwal
Thelwall Community Junior School, Thelwal
Twiss Green Community Primary School, Culcheth
Warrington St Ann's CE Primary School, Orford
Warrington St Barnabas' CE Primary School, Warrington
Westbrook Old Hall Primary School, Warrington
Winwick CE Primary School, Winwick
Woolston CE Primary School, Woolston
Woolston Community Primary School, Woolston

Secondary schools

Beamont Collegiate Academy, Orford
Birchwood Community High School, Birchwood
Bridgewater High School, Appleton
Cardinal Newman Catholic High School, Latchford
Culcheth High School, Culcheth
Great Sankey High School, Great Sankey
King's Leadership Academy Warrington, Woolston
Lymm High School, Lymm
Padgate Academy, Padgate
Penketh High School, Penketh
St Gregory's Catholic High School, Westbrook
Sir Thomas Boteler Church of England High School, Latchford
UTC Warrington, Warrington

Special and alternative schools
Fox Wood Special School, Woolston
Green Lane Community Special School, Woolston
Kassia Academy and Support Services, Padgate

Further education
Priestley College, Wilderspool
Warrington and Vale Royal College, Warrington

Independent schools

Special and alternative schools
Birchwood School, Birchwood
Bright Futures, Lymm
Chaigeley School, Thelwall

Warrington
Schools in Warrington